Taxman is a 1999 film directed by Avi Nesher and written by Nesher and Roger Berger.

Plot
A tax investigator chasing a tax evader stumbles upon a series of bloody murders and gets wrapped up in an investigation with a rookie cop despite his boss' orders to stay out of the way.

Cast
 Joe Pantoliano as Al Benjamin
 Wade Dominguez as Joseph Romero
 Elizabeth Berkley as Nadia Rubikov
 Robert Townsend as Peyton Cody
 Michael Chiklis as Andre Rubakov
 Mike Starr as Mike Neals
 Fisher Stevens as Kenneth Green

References

External links

1999 films
1990s crime drama films
Films directed by Avi Nesher
1990s Russian-language films
1999 drama films
Films scored by Roger Neill
1990s English-language films